Union Hill is a hamlet on the border of the Town of Ontario in Wayne County and the Town of Webster in Monroe County, New York, United States. It is located three miles (5 km) east of the Village of Webster and five miles (8 km) west of the hamlet of Ontario, at an elevation of 453 feet (138 m). The primary cross roads where the hamlet is located are N.Y. Route 404, Ridge Road (CR 103), and County Line Road (CR 100). N.Y. Route 104 passes just north of Union Hill.
A United States Post Office is located in Union Hill with a ZIP Code of 14563.

The Union Hill Fire Department ceased operations on January 1, 2020 after 76 years of continuous operation. The Union Hill Volunteer Ambulance closed three months later.

References
2. http://uhfd.org/thank-you-all/

External links

Hamlets in Wayne County, New York
Hamlets in Monroe County, New York
Hamlets in New York (state)